Cycling at the 1992 Summer Paralympics consisted of nine events. All were road cycling events; no track cycling was held.

Medal summary

Medal table

References 

 

1992 Summer Paralympics events
1992
Paralympics
1992 in road cycling
1992 in track cycling